Amazing Earth is a Philippine television informative show broadcast by GMA Network. Hosted by Dingdong Dantes, it premiered on June 17, 2018, on the network's Sunday Grande sa Gabi line up.

Premise

The show features clips from Planet Earth II and National Geographic's Wild Antarctica and Extreme Animal Babies. The program also features sceneries, tourist spots and the residents in the Philippines.

Production
In March 2020, production was halted due to the enhanced community quarantine in Luzon caused by the COVID-19 pandemic. Production resumed in July 2020. The show resumed its programming on July 26, 2020.

Accolades

References

External links
 

2018 Philippine television series debuts
Filipino-language television shows
GMA Network original programming
Philippine television shows
Television productions suspended due to the COVID-19 pandemic